Cosell is a surname. Notable people with the surname include:

 Greg Cosell, American sports analyst
 Howard Cosell (1918–1995), American sports journalist

See also
 Cowell (surname)